Dargai Pal Dam is an earth filled dam in South Waziristan district of Khyber Pakhtunkhwa, Pakistan.

The construction of dam was started in 2008 and completed in 2010 at a cost of PKR 204 million. The dam has a height of 84 feet,  covered a length of around 764 feet, with actual storage capacity of water 2178 acre feet.

The dam was constructed under supervision of FATA Development Authority. For construction supervision the services of NESPAK were hired.

See also
 List of dams and reservoirs in Pakistan

References

Dams in Khyber Pakhtunkhwa
Dams completed in 2010
2010 establishments in Pakistan
Earth-filled dams